Casteel is a town in Ehlanzeni District Municipality in the Mpumalanga province of South Africa. The legal name was changed to Maboke in 2008. Maboke is place consisting of Mapulana (Sepulana is the language spoken) and Tsonga people. There is proud culture of Dikoma (initiation school) which takes place during the winter times, from the month of June to August annually, and is a place where young boys are taught the cultural and roots of the "Mapulana people".

References

Populated places in the Bushbuckridge Local Municipality